Shahar Pe'er was the defending champion, having won the event in 2013, however she chose not to participate.

Anna-Lena Friedsam won the title, defeating Duan Yingying in the final, 6–1, 6–3.

Seeds

Main draw

Finals

Top half

Bottom half

References 
 Main draw
 Qualifying draw

Suzhou Ladies Open - Singles
Suzhou Ladies Open